An alanorarius, in ancient European customs, was a keeper or manager of spaniels, or setting-dogs, for the sports of hunting and falconry.

The word is formed from the Gothic Alan, a greyhound.

References

Hunting